Gonzaga is a municipality in the state of Minas Gerais, in Brazil.  It is situated in the  Governador Valadares metropolitan area.

Its population was estimated at 6,171 in 2020.

It is Jean Charles de Menezes's native city.

The mayor of Gonzaga is currently Julio Maria de Sousa.

References

Municipalities in Minas Gerais